Anevrina luggeri is a species in the family Phoridae ("scuttle flies"), in the order Diptera ("flies").

References

Further reading

 

Phoridae
Insects described in 1892